Sikachi-Alyan is a small Nanai village on the bank of the Amur river located 75 km north of Khabarovsk. The place is famous for its neolithic petroglyphs (masks) carved on the surface of basalt stones. The drawings date back to the 13th century BC. The local findings demonstrate the ancient history of this area. There is a museum and an open-air reconstruction of an ancient village.

References

Sources 
 

Rural localities in Khabarovsk Krai
Archaeological sites in Russia
World Heritage Tentative List